Club Balonmano Puerto Sagunto is a handball club based in Sagunto, Valencian Community. Puerto Sagunto was founded in 1951 and has played in Liga ASOBAL since the 2012–13 season despite its finish as the bottom team in the 2011–12 season.

Season by season

5 seasons in Liga ASOBAL

Current squad 2015/16

| style="font-size: 95%;" valign="top" | Goalkeepers
01  Ibrahim Moral Criado
12  David Bruixola
16  Juan Carlos Chueca

| style="font-size: 95%;" valign="top" | Line players
18  Alexandro Pozzer
22  Ángel Fernández

| style="font-size: 95%;" valign="top" | Wingers
08  Pocholo
09  Javier Tarrasó
13  Sergio Berrios
20  Antonio Alegre

| style="font-size: 95%;" valign="top" | Back players
04  Rolandas Bernatonis
06  Rubén Ruiz
07  Ilija Sladic
11  Seufyann Sayad
13  Sergio Martes
17  Guillermo Corzo Gomes
20  Antonio Alegre
21  Ignacio Nebot
24  Saša Đukić
73  Jose María Beltrán
75  Juan Antonio Sarió 

| style="font-size: 95%;" valign="top" | Technical staff
 Head Coach  Patxi Martí
 Assistant Coach  Pere Sáez

Stadium information
Name: - Pabellón Municipal de Puerto Sagunto – inaugural year (1975)
City: - Puerto Sagunto, Sagunto
Capacity: - 2.000 people
Address: - Carretera Sagunto-Puerto Sagunto, Km 2,3

Notable famous players 
 Ivan Lapčević
 Ognjen Backovič
 Nikola Prce 
 Nikola Dokić
 Darko Dimitrievski
 Rolandas Bernatonis

References

External links
BM Puerto Sagunto Official Website
RFEBM Profile

Sports teams in the Valencian Community
Spanish handball clubs
Handball clubs established in 1951
1951 establishments in Spain
Liga ASOBAL teams
Sagunto